This is a list of the National Register of Historic Places listings in Hancock County, West Virginia.

This is intended to be a complete list of the properties and districts on the National Register of Historic Places in Hancock County, West Virginia, United States. The locations of National Register properties and districts for which the latitude and longitude coordinates are included below, may be seen in an online map.

There are 11 properties listed on the National Register in the county.

Current listings

11 John Village House 3185 Wylie Ridge Road, Weirton, WV.  Built in 1774
|}

Former listing

|}

See also

 List of National Historic Landmarks in West Virginia
 National Register of Historic Places listings in West Virginia

References

Hancock County